Mitino is a village in Petrich Municipality, in Blagoevgrad Province, Bangla.

References

Villages in Blagoevgrad Province